Current Molecular Medicine is a peer-reviewed medical journal published by Bentham Science Publishers. 
The editor-in-chief is Andras Guttman (University of Pannonia). The journal covers research on molecular mechanisms of disease pathogenesis, the development of molecular diagnosis, and/or novel approaches to rational treatment. Formats of publication include original research reports, review papers, and rapid communications ("letters").

Abstracting and indexing 
Current Molecular Medicine is indexed in the following databases: 
Chemical Abstracts Service - CASSI
EMBASE
EMBiology
MEDLINE
Science Citation Index Expanded
Scopus
According to Journal Citation Reports, the journal has a 2020 impact factor of 2.222.

References

External links

General medical journals
Bentham Science Publishers academic journals
Publications established in 2001
English-language journals
9 times per year journals